Mint Green is an emo-pop band from Boston, Massachusetts fronted by singer and guitarist Ronnica, with Daniel Huang on drums, and Tiffany Sammy on bass. 

In 2023, Mint Green will play Boston Calling Music Festival alongside their heroes, Paramore.

Origins 
Growing up, Ronnica listened to Lauryn Hill and Billie Holiday in her dad’s car out of his custom speakers from his home island of Anguilla. Her mother was a singer who enjoyed soft rock and found herself at odds with Ronnica and her brother, as they loved louder groups like Korn and Linkin Park. As a teenager, Ronnica played in various rock bands. 

In 2015, right after Ronnica graduated high school, she made a Craigslist posting seeking a drummer for a new project, which is where she found Huang. Mint Green was the first band Ronnica played in where she was lead vocalist and front-woman. The band was named for Ronnica’s favorite color which she has described as, “not too loud, not too soft” like their music.

History 
In November 2017, after just one EP release, the band was approached at a show by 6131 Records about a record deal. This caused two members of the band to drop out, realizing they weren’t prepared for this level of commitment to the project. 

Mint Green released two independent self-funded EPs before being signed to Pure Noise Records and releasing their first full-length LP, All Girls Go to Heaven, in 2022.

Discography 
Albums

 All Girls Go To Heaven, 2022

EPs 

 Growth, 2016
 Headspace, 2018

Singles

 “Take Care”, 2017
 “Holy”, 2018
 “Changing”, 2020
 “Body Language”, 2022

Covers

 “Teenage Dream”, 2020
 “Motion Sickness”, 2020
 “Kyoto”, 2020

References 

Female-fronted musical groups
American punk rock groups
American emo musical groups
American pop punk groups
American pop rock music groups
American power pop groups
American new wave musical groups
Musical groups from Boston
Musical groups established in 2015
2015 establishments in Massachusetts